The Hyundai Terracan is a mid-size SUV produced by the South Korean manufacturer Hyundai Motor Company from 2001 to 2007.

Overview
The design of the Hyundai Terracan was originally previewed by the Hyundai Highland concept and featured a chassis derived from the second generation Mitsubishi Pajero. It was powered by one of three engines: a 2.9 liter diesel inline-four Hyundai J engine, a 2.5 liter diesel inline-four licensed from Mitsubishi (4D56), and a 3.5 liter petrol V6 Hyundai Sigma engine. The car's name derives from Tarascan, a Mesoamerican empire state was located in west central Mexico. The Terracan was replaced by the Hyundai Veracruz.

Markets

Australia
Australian specification Terracans were available in three trim levels - base and Highlander. Highlander models came standard with leather seats, climate control airconditioning and an automatic 4wd differential that engaged 4wd on the fly. All models came with low range gearing and a separate ladder frame chassis.

China
The Terracan has also been built and sold in China from 2004 to 2011 under the Hawtai brand in a joint venture with Hyundai that lasted up to 2010. The facelifted version was only available and came with the 2.4 liter 4G64, a 2.5 liter diesel, 2.9 liter J-Series diesel and the 3.5 liter Sigma V6  as standard. Transmission choices were a 5 speed manual or 4 speed automatic.

2001 
In the first year of production (2001), the Terracan was offered with three engines: a 3.5 liter V6 gasoline, a 2.5 liter diesel licensed from Mitsubishi, and a more fuel-efficient 2.9 liter Diesel. Europe, Australia and New Zealand received the 2.9 Diesel.

2002 
When the Terracan entered its second year the only changes were some additional colors.

2004 
2004 brought a light facelift.

Gallery

See also
 Mitsubishi Pajero

References

External links

Terracan
Mid-size sport utility vehicles
All-wheel-drive vehicles
Cars introduced in 2001
2010s cars